Long Island Lutheran Middle and High School (commonly known as LuHi) is a Christian college preparatory school in Brookville, New York, United States. It was founded and built in 1960 on a  estate and has a student body of approximately 420 students in grades 6-12, with students coming from more than 50 school districts throughout Long Island and New York City. The school is accredited by the New York State Association of Independent Schools.

Academics

Students follow a liberal arts curriculum, which includes required courses in English, mathematics, the natural and physical sciences, social studies and government, world language (students can choose between Spanish and French), business, religion, the fine arts, physical education, and health. Electives courses, ranging from entrepreneurship to creative writing, are also offered in all departments. LuHi also offers 17 Advanced Placement courses. Classes are scheduled using a two-day block scheduling system, which includes a weekly school-wide chapel service held in the Chapel/Performing Arts Center.

LuHi students generally perform significantly better than average on standardized high school achievement and college admissions tests, as well as AP exams. LuHi students score higher on the ACT and SAT than both the New York state and national average. Also, the top 10% of the class of 2019 tallied an average cumulative score of 1300 on the SAT and a 31 on the ACT. In addition, in 2019 75% of LuHi AP students scored a 3 or higher on the AP exams. That is compared to 62% of students in New York State, and 59% of students nationwide.

Service learning is an important part of the LuHi experience. Students participate in many service activities throughout the year including coat, food and book drives, Habitat for Humanity Builds, service trips to Nicaragua, Mexico, Puerto Rico, and other countries, as well as a meal packing event to benefit local food pantries and the Andrew Grene School in Haiti. LuHi also offers 25 high school clubs and 14 middle school clubs.

Athletics

Long Island Lutheran fields 17 high school and 5 middle school sports teams, most of which compete in the Private Schools Athletic Association (PSAA)] or the Independent Private and Parochial Schools Athletic League (IPPSAL). The varsity football team competes in the Metropolitan Independent Football League, and won the league championship in 2019. However, the boys and girls varsity basketball teams compete as independents. 

LuHi is known for its highly successful boys and girls basketball programs. The boys team has won eight New York State Federation Championships, while the girls team has won four Federation titles. In March 2011, the boys team won the Class A NYS Federation Championship and the girls team won the Class B NYS Federation Championship, making LuHi only the second school in the history of the tournament to win both the boys and girls titles in the same year (Christ the King Regional High School won both in 2010). A table listing the NYS Federation Championships won by the boys and girls basketball teams is provided below.

Summer programs

In addition to its scholastic activities, LuHi hosts a Summer Program during the summer months. LuHi Summer Programs offer a wide variety of programs throughout four 2-week sessions including sports schools, arts & education programs, and all-around programs, which allow campers to participate in a wide range of recreational activities.

Notable alumni

Reggie Carter, 1975, former professional basketball player for the New York Knicks and St. John's University
Bill Chamberlain, 1968, former professional basketball player for the Phoenix Suns, the Memphis Tams, the Kentucky Colonels, and the University of North Carolina
Jipsta, 1992 (attended from 1987–1989), a Top 5 Billboard recording artist; who had six consecutive Top 10 appearances on the Dance Club Songs chart published by Billboard.
Wayne McKoy, 1977, former professional basketball player in Spain and for the St. John's Redmen
Drew Nicholas, 1999, former professional basketball player for the University of Maryland; 2002 NCAA National Champion with Maryland; 2-time Euroleague Champion (2009, 2011) with Panathinaikos; 2005–06 Alphonso Ford Trophy winner as the Euroleague top scorer
Shamar Stephen, 2009, former professional American football player for the Minnesota Vikings; seventh round draft pick (220th overall) of the Minnesota Vikings in the 2014 NFL Draft; former defensive tackle for the University of Connecticut
Bill Wennington, 1981, former professional basketball player for the Chicago Bulls, among other NBA teams, and St. John's University; 3-time NBA Champion (1996, 1997, 1998) with the Bulls; color commentator for Chicago Bulls radio broadcasts on ESPN Radio 1000<ref><

References

External links
 Long Island Lutheran Middle & High School
 Private Schools Athletic Association (PSAA)
 Independent Private and Parochial Schools Athletic League (IPPSAL)
 LuHi Summer Programs

Private high schools in New York (state)
Schools in Nassau County, New York
Lutheran schools in New York (state)
Private middle schools in New York (state)
Preparatory schools in New York (state)
Secondary schools affiliated with the Lutheran Church–Missouri Synod
Educational institutions established in 1960
1960 establishments in New York (state)